is a professional Japanese baseball player.

External links

1973 births
Living people
Baseball people from Hiroshima Prefecture
Japanese baseball players
Nippon Professional Baseball pitchers
Hiroshima Toyo Carp players
Nippon Professional Baseball Rookie of the Year Award winners
Japanese baseball coaches
Nippon Professional Baseball coaches